A hot-cold empathy gap is a cognitive bias in which people underestimate the influences of visceral drives on their own attitudes, preferences, and behaviors. It is a type of empathy gap.

The most important aspect of this idea is that human understanding is "state-dependent". For example, when one is angry, it is difficult to understand what it is like for one to be calm, and vice versa; when one is blindly in love with someone, it is difficult to understand what it is like for one not to be, (or to imagine the possibility of not being blindly in love in the future). Importantly, an inability to minimize one's gap in empathy can lead to negative outcomes in medical settings (e.g., when a doctor needs to accurately diagnose the physical pain of a patient).

Hot-cold empathy gaps can be analyzed according to their direction:
Hot-to-cold: People under the influence of visceral factors (hot state) don't fully grasp how much their behavior and preferences are being driven by their current state; they think instead that these short-term goals reflect their general and long-term preferences.
Cold-to-hot: People in a cold state have difficulty picturing themselves in hot states, minimizing the motivational strength of visceral impulses. This leads to unpreparedness when visceral forces inevitably arise.

They can also be classified in regards to their relation with time (past or future) and whether they occur intra- or inter-personally:
intrapersonal prospective: the inability to effectively predict their own future behavior when in a different state. See also projection bias.
intrapersonal retrospective: when people recall or try to understand behaviors that happened in a different state.
interpersonal: the attempt to evaluate behaviors or preferences of another person who is in a state different from one's own.

Visceral factors

Visceral factors are an array of influences which include hunger, thirst, sexual arousal, drug cravings for the drugs one is addicted to, physical pain, and strong emotions. These drives have a disproportionate effect on decision making and behavior: the mind, when affected (i.e., in a hot state), tends to ignore all other goals in an effort to placate these influences. These states can lead a person to feel "out of control" and act impulsively.

Areas of study

Bullying
The empathy gap has been an important idea in research about the causes of bullying.

Addiction
George F. Loewenstein explored visceral factors related to addictions like smoking. The factors have to do with drive states which are essential for living – for example, sleepiness and hunger. Loewenstein discovered that addicts mistakenly categorize their addiction as an essential living drive state due to a behavior disorder.

See also

 Curse of knowledge
 Impact bias
 List of cognitive biases
 Omission bias
 Power (philosophy)#Empathy gap
 Projection bias

References

Further reading

Cognitive biases
Interpersonal relationships
Emotion